Mika Niskanen (born July 24, 1973 in Helsinki, Finland) is a professional ice hockey defenceman, currently with Ilves in the Finnish elite league SM-liiga.

Career statistics

Awards 
 Elitserien playoff winner with HV71 in 2004.

External links

References 

 
 

1973 births
Espoo Blues players
Finnish ice hockey defencemen
HIFK (ice hockey) players
HV71 players
Ilves players
KalPa players
Living people
Lahti Pelicans players
Timrå IK players
Ice hockey people from Helsinki